William Bacon Wright (July 4, 1830 – August 10, 1895) was a prominent Confederate politician. He was born in Muscogee County, Georgia and later moved to Texas. He represented that state in the First Confederate Congress.

External links
 Biography

1830 births
1895 deaths
People from Muscogee County, Georgia
Members of the Confederate House of Representatives from Texas
19th-century American politicians